Hangyeore High School (한겨레고등학교) is a government-funded middle and high school for North Korean refugees adjusting to life in South Korea. It opened on March 1, 2006.

Depending on a pupil's performance, he or she may stay in a period from six months to two years. The school intends for students to transition to regular South Korean schools. The school has no tuition fees. It serves three meals per day and has a school uniform. Only children and teenagers originating from North Korea are allowed to attend. The only exception to this was in 2019 when six exchange students (one from the United States, two from Germany, two from France, and one from Sweden) were allowed to attend. 

As of 2010 144 students attend the school. Of them, 79 said that they had watched South Korean media while in North Korea.

References
 Hong, Kyungwha. "Towards an Understanding of North Korean Adolescent Refugees in South Korea." (Archive) Torch Trinity Journal. Torch Trinity Graduate University. Volume 15, Issue 2. ISSN 1598-7140.
 Humanitarian Assistance: Status of North Korean Refugee Resettlement and Asylum in the United States. DIANE Publishing, United States Government Accountability Office, June 2010. , 9781437935325. GAO-10-691.

Notes

External links

  

High schools in South Korea
2006 establishments in South Korea
Educational institutions established in 2006
Schools in Gyeonggi Province